The Rāmāyana is a Sanskrit epic from ancient India, one of the two important epics of Hinduism, known as the Itihasas, the other being the Mahābhārata. The epic, traditionally ascribed to the Maharishi Valmiki, narrates the life of Rama, a legendary prince of Ayodhya city in the kingdom of Kosala. The epic follows his fourteen-year exile to the forest urged by his father King Dasharatha, on the request of Rama's stepmother Kaikeyi; his travels across forests in the Indian subcontinent with his wife Sita and brother Lakshmana, the kidnapping of Sita by Ravana – the king of Lanka, that resulted in war; and Rama's eventual return to Ayodhya to be crowned king amidst jubilation and celebration.

The scholars' estimates for the earliest stage of the text ranging from the 8th to 4th centuries BCE, and later stages extending up to the 3rd century CE, although original date of composition is unknown. It is one of the largest ancient epics in world literature and consists of nearly 24,000 verses (mostly set in the Shloka/Anustubh meter), divided into seven Khanda (parts) the first and the seventh being later additions. It belongs to the genre of Itihasa, narratives of past events, interspersed with teachings on the goals of human life.

There are many versions of Ramayana in Indian languages, besides Buddhist, Sikh and Jain adaptations. There are also Cambodian (Reamker), Indonesian, Filipino, Thai (Ramakien), Lao, Burmese and Malay versions of the tale.

The Ramayana was an important influence on later Sanskrit poetry and the Hindu life and culture, and its main characters were fundamental to the cultural consciousness of a number of nations, both Hindu and Buddhist.

Etymology
, the name of the central figure of the epic, has two contextual meanings. In the Atharvaveda, it means 'dark, dark-coloured, black' and is related to the word  which means 'darkness or stillness of night'. The other meaning, which can be found in the Mahabharata, is 'pleasing, pleasant, charming, lovely, beautiful'. The word  means travel or journey. Thus,  means "Rama's progress", with  altered to  due to the Sanskrit grammar rule of internal sandhi.

Textual characteristics

Genre
The Ramayana belongs to the genre of Itihasa, narratives of past events, which includes the Mahabharata, the Puranas, and the Ramayana. The genre also includes teachings on the goals of human life. It depicts the duties of relationships, portraying ideal characters like the ideal father, the ideal servant, the ideal brother, the ideal husband, and the ideal king. Like the Mahabharata, Ramayana presents the teachings of ancient Hindu sages in the narrative allegory, interspersing philosophical and ethical elements.

Structure
In its extant form, Valmiki's Ramayana is an epic poem of some 24,000 verses, divided into seven s (Bālakāṇḍa, Ayodhyakāṇḍa, Araṇyakāṇḍa, Kiṣkindakāṇḍa, Sundarākāṇḍa, Yuddhakāṇḍa, Uttarakāṇḍa), and about 500 sargas (chapters).

Dating

According to Robert P. Goldman, the oldest parts of the Ramayana date to the mid-8th century BCE. This is due to the narrative not mentioning Buddhism nor the prominence of Magadha. The text also mentions Ayodhya as the capital of Kosala, rather than its later name of Saketa or the successor capital of Shravasti. In terms of narrative time, the action of the Ramayana predates the Mahabharata. Scholarly estimates for the earliest stage of the available text range from the 7th to 4th centuries BCE, with later stages extending up to the 3rd century CE.

Books two to six are the oldest portion of the epic, while the first and last books (Bala Kanda and Uttara Kanda, respectively) seem to be later additions. Style differences and narrative contradictions between these two volumes and the rest of the epic have led scholars since Hermann Jacobi to the present toward this consensus.

Recensions
The Ramayana text has several regional renderings, recensions, and sub-recensions. Textual scholar Robert P. Goldman differentiates two major regional revisions: the northern (n) and the southern (s). Scholar Romesh Chunder Dutt writes that "the Ramayana, like the Mahabharata, is a growth of centuries, but the main story is more distinctly the creation of one mind."

A Times of India report dated 18 December 2015 informs about the discovery of a 6th-century manuscript of the Ramayana at the Asiatic Society library, Kolkata.

There has been discussion as to whether the first and the last volumes (Bala Kanda and Uttara Kanda) of Valmiki's Ramayana were composed by the original author. The uttarākāṇḍa, the bālakāṇḍa, although frequently counted among the main ones, is not a part of the original epic. Though Balakanda is sometimes considered in the main epic, according to many Uttarakanda is certainly a later interpolation and thus is not attributed to the work of Maharshi Valmiki. This fact is reaffirmed by the absence of these two Kāndas in the oldest manuscript. Many Hindus don't believe they are integral parts of the scripture because of some style differences and narrative contradictions between these two volumes and the rest.

Characters

Synopsis

Bāla Kāṇḍa

The epic begins with the sage Vālmīki asking Nārada if there is a righteous man still left in the world, to which Nārada replies that such a man is Rāma. After seeing two birds being shot, Vālmīki creates a new form of meter called śloka, and then is granted the ability to compose an epic poem about Rāma. He teaches his poem to the boys Lava and Kuśa, who recite it throughout the land and eventually at the court of king Rāma, which then begins the main narrative.

Daśaratha was the King of Ayodhyā. He had three wives: Kausalyā, Kaikeyī, and Sumitrā. He did not have a son and in the desire to have a legal heir performs a fire sacrifice known as Putrīyā Iṣṭi. Meanwhile, the gods are petitioning to Brahmā and Viṣṇu about Rāvaṇa, king of the rākṣasas who is terrorizing the universe. Thus Viṣṇu had opted to be born into mortality to combat the demon Rāvaṇa. As a consequence, Rāma was first born to Kausalyā, Bharata was born to Kaikeyī, Lakṣmaṇa and Śatrughna were born to Sumitrā.

When Rāma was 16 years old, the r̥ṣi (sage) Viśvāmitra comes to the court of Daśaratha in search of help against demons who were disturbing sacrificial rites. He chooses Rāma, who is followed by Lakṣmaṇa, his constant companion throughout the story. Rāma and Lakṣmaṇa receive instructions and supernatural weapons from Viśvāmitra and proceed to destroy Tāṭakā and many other demons. Viśvāmitra also recounts much lore of the landscape, his own ancestors, and the ancestors of the princes.

The party then decide to go to attend king Janaka's sacrifice in the kingdom of Mithilā, who has a bow that no one has been able to string. Once there, Janaka recounts the history of the famed bow, and informs them that whoever strings the bow will win the hand of his daughter Sītā, whom he had found in the earth when plowing a field. Rāma then proceeds to not only string the bow, but snap it in the process. Rāma marries Sītā; the wedding is celebrated with great festivity in Mithilā and the marriage party returns to Ayodhyā.

Ayodhyā Kāṇḍa

After Rāma and Sītā have been married, an elderly Daśaratha expresses his desire to crown Rāma, to which the Kosala assembly and his subjects express their support. On the eve of the great event, Kaikeyī was happy about this, but was later on provoked by Mantharā, a wicked maidservant, to claim two boons that Daśaratha had long ago granted her. Kaikeyī demands Rāma to be exiled into the wilderness for fourteen years, while the succession passes to her son Bharata.

The heartbroken king, constrained by his rigid devotion to his given word, accedes to Kaikeyī's demands. Rāma accepts his father's reluctant decree with absolute submission and calm self-control which characterizes him throughout the story. He asks Sītā to remain in Ayodhyā, but she convinces him to remain with him in exile. Lakṣmaṇa also resolves to follow his brother into the forest.

After Rāma's departure, King Daśaratha, unable to bear the grief, passes away. Meanwhile, Bharata, who was on a visit to his maternal uncle, learns about the events in Ayodhyā. Bharata refuses to profit from his mother's wicked scheming and visits Rāma in the forest. He requests Rāma to return and rule. But Rāma, determined to carry out his father's orders to the letter, refuses to return before the period of exile.

Aranya Kanda

After thirteen years of exile, Rama, Sita, and Lakshmana journey southward along the banks of the river Godavari, where they build cottages and live off the land. At the Panchavati forest they are visited by a rakshasi named Shurpanakha, sister of Ravana. She tries to seduce the brothers and, after failing, attempts to kill Sita. Lakshmana stops her by cutting off her nose and ears. Hearing of this, her brothers Khara and Dushan organize an attack against the princes. Rama defeats Khara and his rakshasas.

When the news of these events reaches Ravana, he resolves to destroy Rama by capturing Sita with the aid of the rakshasa Maricha. Maricha, assuming the form of a golden deer, captivates Sita's attention. Entranced by the beauty of the deer, Sita pleads with Rama to capture it. Rama, aware that this is the ploy of the demons, cannot dissuade Sita from her desire and chases the deer into the forest, leaving Sita under Lakshmana's guard.

After some time, Sita hears Rama calling out to her; afraid for his life, she insists that Lakshmana rush to his aid. Lakshmana tries to assure her that Rama cannot be hurt that easily and that it is best if he continues to follow Rama's orders to protect her. On the verge of hysterics, Sita insists that it is not she but Rama who needs Lakshman's help. He obeys her wish but stipulates that she is not to leave the cottage or entertain any stranger. He then draws a line that no demon could cross and leaves to help Rama. With the coast finally clear, Ravana appears in the guise of an ascetic requesting Sita's hospitality. Unaware of her guest's plan, Sita is tricked and is then forcibly carried away by Ravana.

Jatayu, a vulture, tries to rescue Sita but is mortally wounded. In Lanka, Sita is kept under the guard of rakshasis. Ravana asks Sita to marry him, but she refuses, being totally devoted to Rama. Meanwhile, Rama and Lakshmana learn about Sita's abduction from Jatayu and immediately set out to save her. During their search, they meet Kabandha and the ascetic Shabari, who direct them towards Sugriva and Hanuman.

Kishkindha Kanda

Citadel Kishkindha Kanda is set in the place of Vānaras (Vana-nara) - Forest dwelling humans. Rama and Lakshmana meet Hanuman, the biggest devotee of Rama, greatest of ape heroes, and an adherent of Sugriva, the banished pretender to the throne of Kishkindha. Rama befriends Sugriva and helps him by killing his elder brother Vali thus regaining the kingdom of Kishkindha, in exchange for helping Rama to recover Sita.

However, Sugriva soon forgets his promise and spends his time enjoying his newly gained power. The clever former ape queen Tara (wife of Vali) calmly intervenes to prevent an enraged Lakshmana from destroying the ape citadel. She then eloquently convinces Sugriva to honor his pledge. Sugriva then sends search parties to the four corners of the earth, only to return without success from north, east, and west. The southern search party under the leadership of Angada and Hanuman learns from a vulture named Sampati (elder brother of Jatayu), that Sita was taken to Lanka.

Sundara Kanda

Sundara Kanda forms the heart of Valmiki's Ramayana and consists of a detailed, vivid account of Hanuman's heroics. After learning about Sita, Hanuman assumes a gargantuan form and makes a colossal leap across the sea to Lanka. On the way, he meets with many challenges like facing a Gandharva Kanya who comes in the form of a demon to test his abilities. He encounters a mountain named Mainakudu who offers Hanuman assistance and offers him rest. Hanuman refuses because there is little time remaining to complete the search for Sita.

After entering Lanka, he finds a demon, Lankini, who protects all of Lanka. Hanuman fights with her and subjugates her in order to get into Lanka. In the process, Lankini, who had an earlier vision/warning from the gods, therefore, knows that the end of Lanka nears if someone defeats Lankini. Here, Hanuman explores the demons' kingdom and spies on Ravana. He locates Sita in Ashoka grove, where she is being wooed and threatened by Ravana and his rakshasis to marry Ravana.

Hanuman reassures Sita, giving Rama's signet ring as a sign that Rama is still alive. He offers to carry Sita back to Rama; however, she refuses and says that it is not the dharma, stating that Ramayana will not have significance if Hanuman carries her to Rama – "When Rama is not there Ravana carried Sita forcibly and when Ravana was not there, Hanuman carried Sita back to Rama". She says that Rama himself must come and avenge the insult of her abduction. She gives Hanuman her comb as a token to prove that she is still alive.

Hanuman takes leave of Sita. Before he leaves Lanka to go back to Rama and tell him of Sita's location & desire to be rescued only by him, he decides to wreak havoc in Lanka by destroying trees in the Naulakha Bagh and buildings and killing Ravana's warriors. He allows himself to be captured and delivered to Ravana. He gives a bold lecture to Ravana to release Sita. He is condemned and his tail is set on fire, but he escapes his bonds and leaps from roof to roof, sets fire to Ravana's citadel, and makes the giant leap back from the island. The joyous search party returns to Kishkindha with the news.

Yuddha Kanda

Also known as Lanka Kanda, this book describes the war between the army of Rama and the army of Ravana. Having received Hanuman's report on Sita, Rama and Lakshmana proceed with their allies towards the shore of the southern sea. There they are joined by Ravana's renegade brother Vibhishana. The apes named Nala and Nila construct a floating bridge (known as Rama Setu) across the sea, using stones that floated on water because they had Rama's name written on them and one story also tells that they had been cursed by a sage that whatever they will throw in a water body will not sink, rather it will float.

The princes and their army cross over to Lanka. A lengthy war ensues. During a battle, Ravana's son Indrajit hurls a powerful weapon at Lakshmana, who is badly wounded. So Hanuman assumes a gigantic form and flies from Lanka to the Himalayas. Upon reaching Mount Sumeru, Hanuman was unable to identify the herb that could cure Lakshmana and so decided to bring the entire mountain back to Lanka. Eventually, the war ends when Rama kills Ravana. Rama then installs Vibhishana on the throne of Lanka.

On meeting Sita, Rama said, "the dishonour meted out to him and the wrong done to her by Ravana have been wiped off, by his victory over the enemy with the assistance of Hanuman, Sugreeva and Vibhishana". However, upon criticism from people in his kingdom, Rama disowns her and asks her to seek shelter elsewhere. Sita requests Lakshmana to prepare a pile of fire for her to enter. When Lakshmana prepares a pyre, Sita prays to the god Agni and enters into it, in order to prove her conjugal fidelity. Agni appears in person from the burning pyre, carrying Sita in his arms and restores her to Rama, testifying to her purity. Rama later joyfully accepts her. The episode of Agni Pariksha varies in the versions of Ramayana by Valmiki and Tulsidas. In Tulsidas's Ramacharitamanas, Sita was under the protection of Agni (see Maya Sita) so it was necessary to bring her out before reuniting with Rama.

Uttara Kanda 

Considered by several scholars to be an interpolation to the original six chapters, this kanda narrates Rama's reign of Ayodhya, the birth of Lava and Kusha, the Ashvamedha yajna, and last days of Rama. At the expiration of his term of exile, Rama returns to Ayodhya with Sita, Lakshmana, and Hanuman, where the coronation is performed. On being asked to prove his devotion to Rama, Hanuman tears his chest open and to everyone's surprise, there is an image of Rama and Sita inside his chest. Rama rules Ayodhya and the reign is called Rama-Rajya (a place where the common folk is happy, fulfilled, and satisfied).

After hearing from his ministers that his subjects were unhappy with the fact that their king had chosen to recouncile with a woman who had lived in the house of another man, Rama is furious as Sita had proved to everyone she was pure through the agnipariksha. In order to uphold his rank as the champion of dharma, Sita, who was pregnant was sent to exile into the forest. She finds refuge in Sage Valmiki's ashram, where she gives birth to twin boys, Lava and Kusha. Meanwhile, Rama conducts an Ashvamedha yajna (A Vedic, royal assertion of sovereignty) and in absence of Sita, places a golden statue of her.

Lava and Kusha capture the horse (the vehicle of the yajna), and defeat the whole army of Ayodhya that had accompanied the horse. Later on, the brothers defeat Lakshmana, Bharata, Shatrughna, and other warriors and take Hanuman as prisoner. Finally, Rama himself arrives and defeats the two mighty brothers. Valmiki updates Sita about this development and advises both the brothers to go to Ayodhya and tell the story of Sita's sacrifice to the common folk. Both brothers arrive at Ayodhya, but face many difficulties while convincing the people. Hanuman helps both the brothers in this task.

At some point, Valmiki brings Sita forward. Seeing Sita, Rama is teary-eyed and realises that Lava and Kusha are his own sons. Nagarasen (one of the ministers who instigated the hatred towards Sita) challenges Sita's character and asks her to prove her purity. Sita is overwhelmed with emotion, and decides to go back to the Earth from where she emerged. She says that, "If I am pure, this earth will open and swallow me whole."

At that very moment, the earth opens up and swallows Sita. Rama rules Ayodhya for many years and finally takes Samadhi into Sarayu river along with his three brothers and leaves the world. He goes back to Vaikuntha in his Vishnu form (Lakshmana as Adishesha, Bharata as his conch, and Shatrughana as the Sudarshana Chakra) and meets Sita there, who by then had assumed her true form of Lakshmi.

Versions

As in many oral epics, multiple versions of the Ramayana survive. In particular, the Ramayana related in north India differs in important respects from that preserved in south India and the rest of southeast Asia. There is an extensive tradition of oral storytelling based on Ramayana in Indonesia, Cambodia, Philippines, Thailand, Malaysia, Laos, Vietnam and Maldives.

India

There are diverse regional versions of the Ramayana written by various authors in India. Some of them differ significantly from each other. A West Bengal manuscript from the 6th century presents the epic without two of its kandas. During the 12th century, Kamban wrote Ramavataram, known popularly as Kambaramayanam in Tamil, but references to Ramayana story appear in Tamil literature as early as 3rd century CE. A Telugu version, Ranganatha Ramayanam, was written by Gona Budda Reddy in the 13th century.

The earliest translation to a regional Indo-Aryan language is the early 14th century Saptakanda Ramayana in Assamese by Madhava Kandali. Valmiki's Ramayana inspired Sri Ramacharit Manas by Tulsidas in 1576, an epic Awadhi (a dialect of Hindi) version with a slant more grounded in a different realm of Hindu literature, that of bhakti; it is an acknowledged masterpiece of India, popularly known as Tulsi-krita Ramayana. Gujarati poet Premanand wrote a version of the Ramayana in the 17th century. Akbar, the third Mughal Emperor, commissioned a simplified text of the Ramayana which he dedicated to his mother, Hamida Banu Begum. Created around 1594, the manuscript is illustrated with scenes from the narrative.

Other versions include Krittivasi Ramayan, a Bengali version by Krittibas Ojha in the 15th century; Vilanka Ramayana by 15th century poet Sarala Dasa and Jagamohana Ramayana (also known as Dandi Ramayana) by 16th century poet Balarama Dasa, both in Odia; a Torave Ramayana in Kannada by 16th-century poet Narahari; Adhyathmaramayanam, a Malayalam version by Thunchaththu Ramanujan Ezhuthachan in the 16th century; in Marathi by Sridhara in the 18th century; in Maithili by Chanda Jha in the 19th century; and in the 20th century, Rashtrakavi Kuvempu's Sri Ramayana Darshanam in Kannada and Srimad Ramayana Kalpavrikshamu in Telugu by Viswanatha Satyanarayana who received Jnanapeeth award for this work.

There is a sub-plot to the Ramayana, prevalent in some parts of India, relating the adventures of Ahiravan and Mahi Ravana, evil brother of Ravana, which enhances the role of Hanuman in the story. Hanuman rescues Rama and Lakshmana after they are kidnapped by the Ahi-Mahi Ravana at the behest of Ravana and held prisoner in a cave, to be sacrificed to the goddess Kali. Adbhuta Ramayana is a version that is obscure but also attributed to Valmiki – intended as a supplementary to the original Valmiki Ramayana. In this variant of the narrative, Sita is accorded far more prominence, such as elaboration of the events surrounding her birth – in this case to Ravana's wife, Mandodari as well as her conquest of Ravana's older brother in the Mahakali form.

The Gondi people have their own version of the Ramayana known as the Gond Ramayani, derived from oral folk legends. It consists of seven stories with Lakshmana as the protagonist, set after the main events of the Ramayana, where he finds a bride.

Early medieval recension from Bengal
Chance discovery of a 6th-century manuscript reveals insights into the evolution of the narrative. Importantly, the ‘Daśagrīvā Rākṣasa Charitrām Vadham’ (Slaying of the Ten-Headed Giant) manuscript contains only five kandas (chapters), and ends with the trio's triumphant return to Ayodhya.

Missing from this particular recension are the ‘Balakanda’ dealing with Rama's childhood, and the ‘Uttarakanda’ – which narrates (a) Rama's divinity as an avatar of Vishnu, (b) the events leading up to the exile of Sita, (c) the death of Rama's devoted brother, Lakshmana. These are also the only two books where the Sage Valmiki appears as a character.

The manuscript was discovered in 2015, from an archive compiled by the German Indologist Theodor Aufrecht.

Early references in Tamil literature

Even before Kambar wrote the Ramavataram in Tamil in the 12th century AD, there are many ancient references to the story of Ramayana, implying that the story was familiar in the Tamil lands even before the Common Era. References to the story can be found in the Sangam literature of Akanaṉūṟu (dated 1st century BCE) and Purananuru (dated 300 BC), the twin epics of Silappatikaram (dated 2nd century CE) and Manimekalai (cantos 5, 17 and 18), and the Alvar literature of Kulasekhara Alvar, Thirumangai Alvar, Andal and Nammalvar (dated between 5th and 10th centuries CE). Even the songs of the Nayanmars have references to Ravana and his devotion to Lord Siva.

Buddhist version

In the Buddhist variant of the Ramayana (Dasaratha Jataka), Dasharatha was king of Benares and not Ayodhya. Rama (called Rāmapaṇḍita in this version) was the son of Kaushalya, first wife of Dasharatha. Lakṣmaṇa (Lakkhaṇa) was a sibling of Rama and son of Sumitra, the second wife of Dasharatha. Sita was the wife of Rama. To protect his children from his wife Kaikeyi, who wished to promote her son Bharata, Dasharatha sent the three to a hermitage in the Himalayas for a twelve-year exile.

After nine years, Dasharatha died and Lakkhaṇa and Sita returned. Rāmapaṇḍita, in deference to his father's wishes, remained in exile for a further two years. This version does not include the abduction of Sītā. There is no Ravana in this version, or the Rama-Ravana war. However, Ravana appears in other Buddhist literature, the Lankavatara Sutra.

In the explanatory commentary on Jātaka, Rāmapaṇḍita is said to have been a previous birth of the Buddha, and Sita as previous birth of Yasodharā (Rahula-Mata).

Jain versions

Jain versions of the Ramayana can be found in the various Jain agamas like Saṅghadāsagaṇī Vāchaka's Vasudevahiṇḍī (circa 4th century CE), Ravisena's Padmapurana (story of Padmaja and Rama, Padmaja being the name of Sita), Hemacandra's Trisastisalakapurusa charitra (hagiography of 63 illustrious persons), Sanghadasa's Vasudevahindi and Uttarapurana by Gunabhadara. According to Jain cosmology, every half time cycle has nine sets of Balarama, Vasudeva and prativasudeva.

Rama, Lakshmana and Ravana are the eighth Baldeva, Vasudeva and prativasudeva respectively. Padmanabh Jaini notes that, unlike in the Hindu Puranas, the names Baladeva and Vasudeva are not restricted to Balarama and Krishna in Jain Puranas. Instead they serve as names of two distinct classes of mighty brothers, who appear nine times in each half time cycle and jointly rule half the earth as half-chakravartins. Jaini traces the origin of this list of brothers to the jinacharitra (lives of jinas) by Acharya Bhadrabahu (3d–4th century BCE).

In the Jain epic of Ramayana, it is not Rama who kills Ravana as told in the Hindu version. Perhaps this is because Rama, a liberated Jain Self in his last life, is unwilling to kill. Instead, it is Lakshmana who kills Ravana (as Vasudeva killes Prativasudeva). In the end, Rama, who led an upright life, renounces his kingdom, becomes a Jain monk and attains moksha. On the other hand, Lakshmana and Ravana go to Hell. However, it is predicted that ultimately they both will be reborn as upright persons and attain liberation in their future births. According to Jain texts, Ravana will be the future Tirthankara (omniscient teacher) of Jainism.

The Jain versions have some variations from Valmiki's Ramayana. Dasharatha, the king of Ayodhya had four queens: Aparajita, Sumitra, Suprabha and Kaikeyi. These four queens had four sons. Aparajita's son was Padma and he became known by the name of Rama. Sumitra's son was Narayana: he came to be known by another name, Lakshmana. Kaikeyi's son was Bharata and Suprabha's son was Shatrughna. Furthermore, not much was thought of Rama's fidelity to Sita. According to the Jain version, Rama had four chief queens: Maithili, Prabhavati, Ratinibha, and Sridama.

Furthermore, Sita takes renunciation as a Jain ascetic after Rama abandons her and is reborn in heaven as Indra. Rama, after Lakshman's death, also renounces his kingdom and becomes a Jain monk. Ultimately, he attains Kevala Jnana omniscience and finally liberation. Rama predicts that Ravana and Lakshmana, who were in the fourth hell, will attain liberation in their future births. Accordingly, Ravana is the future Tirthankara of the next half ascending time cycle and Sita will be his Ganadhara.

Sikh version

In the holiest Sikh scripture the Guru Granth Sahib, there is a description of two types of Ramayana. One is a spiritual Ramayana which is the actual subject of Guru Granth Sahib, in which Ravana is ego, Sita is budhi (intellect), Rama is inner Self and Laxman is mann (attention, mind). Guru Granth Sahib also believes in the existence of Dashavatara who were kings of their times which tried their best to restore order to the world. King Rama (Ramchandra) was one of those who is not covered in Guru Granth Sahib. Guru Granth Sahib states:
ਹੁਕਮਿ ਉਪਾਏ ਦਸ ਅਉਤਾਰਾ॥
हुकमि उपाए दस अउतारा॥
By hukam (supreme command), he created his ten incarnations
Rather there is no Ramayana written by any Guru. Guru Gobind Singh however is known to have written Ram Avatar in a text which is highly debated on its authenticity. Guru Gobind Singh clearly states that though all the 24 avatars incarnated for the betterment of the world, but fell prey to ego and therefore were destroyed by the supreme creator..

He also said that the almighty, invisible, all prevailing God created great numbers of Indras, Moons and Suns, Deities, Demons and sages, and also numerous saints and Brahmanas (enlightened people). But they too were caught in the noose of death (Kaal) (transmigration of the soul).

Nepal
Besides being the site of discovery of the oldest surviving manuscript of the Ramayana, Nepal gave rise to two regional variants in mid 19th – early 20th century. One, written by Bhanubhakta Acharya, is considered the first epic of Nepali language, while the other, written by Siddhidas Mahaju in Nepal Bhasa was a foundational influence in the Nepal Bhasa renaissance.

Ramayana written by Bhanubhakta Acharya is one of the most popular verses in Nepal. The popularization of the Ramayana and its tale, originally written in Sanskrit Language was greatly enhanced by the work of Bhanubhakta. Mainly because of his writing of Nepali Ramayana, Bhanubhakta is also called Aadi Kavi or The Pioneering Poet.

Southeast Asian

Cambodia

The Cambodian version of the Ramayana, Reamker ( - Glory of Rama), is the most famous story of Khmer literature since the Kingdom of Funan era. It adapts the Hindu concepts to Buddhist themes and shows the balance of good and evil in the world. The Reamker has several differences from the original Ramayana, including scenes not included in the original and emphasis on Hanuman and Sovann Maccha, a retelling which influences the Thai and Lao versions.

Indonesia

There are several Indonesian adaptations of Ramayana, including the Javanese Kakawin Ramayana and Balinese Ramakavaca. The first half of Kakawin Ramayana is similar to the original Sanskrit version, while the latter half is very different. One of the recognizable modifications is the inclusion of the indigenous Javanese guardian demigod, Semar, and his sons, Gareng, Petruk, and Bagong who make up the numerically significant four Punokawan or "clown servants".

Kakawin Ramayana is believed to have been written in Central Java circa 870 AD during the reign of Mpu Sindok in the Mataram Kingdom. The Javanese Kakawin Ramayana is not based on Valmiki's epic, which was then the most famous version of Rama's story, but based on Ravanavadha or the "Ravana massacre", which is the sixth or seventh century poem by Indian poet Bhattikavya.

Kakawin Ramayana was further developed on the neighboring island of Bali becoming the Balinese Ramakavaca. The bas-reliefs of Ramayana and Krishnayana scenes are carved on balustrades of the 9th century Prambanan temple in Yogyakarta, as well as in the 14th century Penataran temple in East Java. In Indonesia, the Ramayana is a deeply ingrained aspect of the culture, especially among Javanese, Balinese and Sundanese people, and has become the source of moral and spiritual guidance as well as aesthetic expression and entertainment, for example in wayang and traditional dances.

The Balinese kecak dance for example, retells the story of the Ramayana, with dancers playing the roles of Rama, Sita, Lakhsmana, Jatayu, Hanuman, Ravana, Kumbhakarna and Indrajit surrounded by a troupe of over 50 bare-chested men who serve as the chorus chanting "cak". The performance also includes a fire show to describe the burning of Lanka by Hanuman. In Yogyakarta, the Wayang Wong Javanese dance also retells the Ramayana. One example of a dance production of the Ramayana in Java is the Ramayana Ballet performed on the Trimurti Prambanan open air stage, with dozens of actors and the three main prasad spires of the Prambanan Hindu temple as a backdrop.

Laos

Phra Lak Phra Lam is a Lao language version, whose title comes from Lakshmana and Rama. The story of Lakshmana and Rama is told as the previous life of Gautama buddha.

Malaysia

The Hikayat Seri Rama of Malaysia incorporated element of both Hindu and Islamic mythology.

Myanmar

Yama Zatdaw is the Burmese version of Ramayana. It is also considered the unofficial national epic of Myanmar. There are nine known pieces of the Yama Zatdaw in Myanmar. The Burmese name for the story itself is Yamayana, while zatdaw refers to the acted play or being part of the jataka tales of Theravada Buddhism. This Burmese version is also heavily influenced by Ramakien (Thai version of Ramayana) which resulted from various invasions by Konbaung dynasty kings toward the Ayutthaya Kingdom.

Philippines

The Maharadia Lawana, an epic poem of the Maranao people of the Philippines, has been regarded as an indigenized version of the Ramayana since it was documented and translated into English by Professor Juan R. Francisco and Nagasura Madale in 1968. The poem, which had not been written down before Francisco and Madale's translation, narrates the adventures of the monkey-king, Maharadia Lawana, to whom the Gods have granted immortality.

Francisco, an indologist from the University of the Philippines Manila, believed that the Ramayana narrative arrived in the Philippines some time between the 17th to 19th centuries, via interactions with Javanese and Malaysian cultures which traded extensively with India.

By the time it was documented in the 1960s, the character names, place names, and the precise episodes and events in Maharadia Lawana's narrative already had some notable differences from those of the Ramayana. Francisco believed that this was a sign of "indigenization", and suggested that some changes had already been introduced in Malaysia and Java even before the story was heard by the Maranao, and that upon reaching the Maranao homeland, the story was "further indigenized to suit Philippine cultural perspectives and orientations."

Thailand

In , Sita is the daughter of Ravana and Mandodari ( and ). Vibhishana, the astrologer brother of Ravana, predicts the death of Ravana from Sita's horoscope. Ravana throws her into the water, but she is later rescued by Janaka.

While the main story is identical to that of Ramayana, many other aspects were transposed into a Thai context, such as the clothes, weapons, topography and elements of nature, which are described as being Thai in style. It has an expanded role for Hanuman and he is portrayed as a lascivious character. Ramakien can be seen in an elaborate illustration at Wat Phra Kaew in Bangkok.

Critical edition

A critical edition of the text was compiled in India in the 1960s and 1970s, by the Oriental Institute at Maharaja Sayajirao University of Baroda, India, utilizing dozens of manuscripts collected from across India and the surrounding region. An English language translation of the critical edition was completed in November 2016 by Sanskrit scholar Robert P. Goldman of the University of California, Berkeley. Another English translation of Critical Edition of Valmiki Ramayana (in three volumes) with extensive footnotes was done by an Indian Scholar, economist and translator Bibek Debroy in October, 2017.

Commentaries
It is said that there are around thirty three commentaries for Ramayana.

Influence of Ramayana

One of the most important literary works of ancient India, the Ramayana has had a profound impact on art and culture in the Indian subcontinent and southeast Asia with the lone exception of Vietnam. The story ushered in the tradition of the next thousand years of massive-scale works in the rich diction of regal courts and Hindu temples. It has also inspired much secondary literature in various languages, notably Kambaramayanam by Tamil poet Kambar of the 12th century, Telugu language Molla Ramayanam by poet Molla and Ranganatha Ramayanam by poet Gona Budda Reddy, 14th century Kannada poet Narahari's Torave Ramayana and 15th century Bengali poet Krittibas Ojha's Krittivasi Ramayan, as well as the 16th century Awadhi version, Ramacharitamanas, written by Tulsidas.

Ramayanic scenes have also been depicted through terracottas, stone sculptures, bronzes and paintings. These include the stone panel at Nagarjunakonda in Andhra Pradesh depicting Bharata's meeting with Rama at Chitrakuta (3rd century CE).

The Ramayana became popular in Southeast Asia during 8th century and was represented in literature, temple architecture, dance and theatre. Today, dramatic enactments of the story of the Ramayana, known as Ramlila, take place all across India and in many places across the globe within the Indian diaspora.

In Indonesia, especially Java and Bali, Ramayana has become a popular source of artistic expression for dance drama and shadow puppet performances in the region. Sendratari Ramayana is the Javanese traditional ballet in wayang orang style, routinely performed in the cultural center of Yogyakarta. Large casts were part of outdoor and indoor performances presented regularly at Prambanan Trimurti temple for many years. Balinese dance dramas of Ramayana were also performed frequently in Balinese Hindu temples in Ubud and Uluwatu, where scenes from Ramayana are an integral part of kecak dance performances. Javanese Wayang (Wayang Kulit of purwa and Wayang Wong) also draw from Ramayana or Mahabharata.

Ramayana has also been depicted in many paintings, notably by the Indonesian (Balinese) artists such as I Gusti Dohkar (before 1938), I Dewa Poetoe Soegih, I Dewa Gedé Raka Poedja, Ida Bagus Made Togog before 1948 period. Their paintings are currently in the National Museum of World Cultures collections of Tropenmuseum in Amsterdam, Netherlands. Malaysian artist Syed Thajudeen also depicted Ramayana in 1972. The painting is currently in the permanent collection of the Malaysian National Visual Arts Gallery.

In popular culture
Multiple modern, English-language adaptations of the epic exist, namely Rama Chandra Series by Amish Tripathi, Ramayana Series by Ashok Banker and a mythopoetic novel, Asura: Tale of the Vanquished by Anand Neelakantan. Another Indian author, Devdutt Pattanaik, has published three different retellings and commentaries of Ramayana titled Sita, The Book Of Ram and Hanuman's Ramayan. A number of plays, movies and television serials have also been produced based upon the Ramayana.

Stage

One of the best known Ramayana plays is Gopal Sharman's The Ramayana, a contemporary interpretation in English, of the great epic based on the Valmiki Ramayana. The play has had more than 3000 plus performances all over the world, mostly as a one-woman performance by actress Jalabala Vaidya, wife of the playwright Gopal Sharman. The Ramayana has been performed on Broadway, London's West End, United Nations Headquarters, the Smithsonian Institution among other international venue and in more than 35 cities and towns in India.

Starting in 1978 and under the supervision of Baba Hari Dass, Ramayana has been performed every year by Mount Madonna School in Watsonville, California. It takes the form of a colorful musical with custom costumes, sung and spoken dialog, jazz-rock orchestration and dance. This performance takes place in a large audience theater setting usually in June, in San Jose, CA. Dass has taught acting arts, costume-attire design, mask making and choreography to bring alive characters of Rama, Sita, Hanuman, Lakshmana, Shiva, Parvati, Vibhishan, Jatayu, Sugriva, Surpanakha, Ravana and his rakshasa court, Meghnadha, Kumbhakarna and the army of monkeys and demons.

In the Philippines, a jazz ballet production was produced in the 1970s entitled "Rama at Sita" (Rama and Sita).

The production was a result of a collaboration of four National Artists, Bienvenido Lumbera's libretto (National Artist for Literature), production design by Salvador Bernal (National Artist for Stage Design), music by Ryan Cayabyab (National Artist for Music) and choreography by Alice Reyes (National Artist for Dance).

Plays
 Kanchana Sita, Saketham and Lankalakshmi – award-winning trilogy by Malayalam playwright C. N. Sreekantan Nair
 Lankeswaran – a play by the award-winning Tamil cinema actor R. S. Manohar
 Kecak - a Balinese traditional folk dance which plays and tells the story of Ramayana

Exhibitions
 Gallery Nucleus: Ramayana Exhibition -Part of the art of the book Ramayana: Divine Loophole by Sanjay Patel.
 The Rama epic: Hero. Heroine, Ally, Foe by The Asian Art Museum.

Books
 Ramayana by C. Rajagopalachari
 The Ramayana by R. K. Narayan
 The Song of Rama by Vanamali
 Ramayana by William Buck and S Triest
 Ramayana: Divine Loophole by Sanjay Patel
 Ramayana series by Ashok Banker. A fictional retelling of the Ramayana. It has eight books — Prince of Ayodhya, Siege of Mithila, Demons of Chitrakut, Armies of Hanuman, Bridge of Rama, King of Ayodhya, Vengeance of Ravana and Sons of Sita.
 Sita: An Illustrated Retelling of the Ramayana By Devdutt Pattanaik
 Hanuman's Ramayan By Devdutt Pattanaik
 Rama Chandra Series by Amish Tripathi, a fictional retelling of the Ramayana. It has four books until now — Ram: Scion of Ikshvaku, Sita: Warrior of Mithila, Raavan: Enemy of Aryavarta and The War of Lanka
 Asura, Tale of the Vanquished by Anand Neelakantan, a novel.
 The Forest of Enchantments by Chitra Banerjee Divakaruni.
 The Crystal Guardian series by Ravi Venugopal, a mythological fiction trilogy, written from Rama's point of view. Part 1 - The Exiled Prince

Movies 

 Lanka Dahan (1917)
Ramayana (1942)
 Ram Rajya (1943)
 Rambaan (1948)
 Ramayan (1954)
 Sampoorna Ramayanam (1958)
 Sampoorna Ramayana (1961)
 Lava Kusha (1963)
 Sampoorna Ramayanamu (1971)
 Sita Kalyanam (1976)
 Kanchana Sita (1977)
 Ramayana: The Legend of Prince Rama (1992)
 Ramayanam (1996)
 Lav Kush (1997)
 Opera Jawa (2008)
 Sita Sings the Blues (2008)
 Ramayana: The Epic (2010)
 Lava Kusa: The Warrior Twins (2010)
 Raavanan (2010)
 Raavan (2010)
 Sri Rama Rajyam (2011)
 Yak: The Giant King (2012)
 Monkey Enters Lanka (2020)
 Adipurush (2023), upcoming film

TV series
 Ramayan – originally broadcast on Doordarshan, produced by Ramanand Sagar in 1987
 Luv Kush – originally broadcast on Doordarshan, produced by Ramanand Sagar in 1988
 Jai Hanuman – originally broadcast on Doordarshan, produced and directed by Sanjay Khan
Vishnu Puran (TV series) - originally broadcast on Doordarshan, produced by B. R. Chopra in 2000
 Ramayan (2002) – originally broadcast on Zee TV, produced by B.R. Chopra
 Ramayan (2008) – originally broadcast on Imagine TV, produced by Sagar Enterprise
 Ramayan (2012) – a remake of the 1987 series and aired on Zee TV
 Antariksh (2004) – a sci-fi version of Ramayan. Originally broadcast on Star Plus
 Raavan – series on life of Ravana based on Ramayana. Originally broadcast on Zee TV
 Sankatmochan Mahabali Hanuman – 2015 series based on the life of Hanuman presently broadcasting on Sony TV
 Siya Ke Ram – a series on Star Plus, originally broadcast from 16 November 2015 to 4 November 2016 series based on "Ramayan", showing Ramayan from Sita's prospective
 Ravana - a series on TV Derana from Sri Lanka, originally broadcast on 2019.
 Rama Siya Ke Luv Kush – 2019 series based on Uttar Ramayan, showing the life of children of Rama Sita, Kush and Luv broadcasting on Colors TV
The Legend of Hanuman – A 2021 OTT animated version of the Ramayana from Hanuman's point of perspective. It depicts the 2nd-5th Kandas of the Ramayana aired on Disney+ Hotstar.

Nomenclatures 
Ramayana has had a profound influence on India and Indians across the geographical and historical space. Rampur is the most common name for villages and towns across the nation particularly UP, Bihar and West Bengal. It is so common that people have been using Ram Ram as a greeting to each other.

Notes

References

Sources

 Arya, Ravi Prakash (ed.).Ramayana of Valmiki: Sanskrit Text and English Translation. (English translation according to M. N. Dutt, introduction by Dr. Ramashraya Sharma, 4-volume set) Parimal Publications: Delhi, 1998, 
 
 
 
 
 
 

 

 
 
 
 
 
 Mahulikar, Dr. Gauri. Effect Of Ramayana On Various Cultures And Civilisations, Ramayan Institute
 Rabb, Kate Milner, National Epics, 1896 – see eText in Project Gutenberg
 
  (see also Wikipedia article on book)
 Raghunathan, N. (transl.), Srimad Valmiki Ramayanam, Vighneswara Publishing House, Madras (1981)
 
 
 
 
 A different Song – Article from "The Hindu" 12 August 2005 – 
 Valmiki's Ramayana illustrated with Indian miniatures from the 16th to the 19th century, 2012, Editions Diane de Selliers,

Further reading

Sanskrit text
 Electronic version of the Sanskrit text, input by Muneo Tokunaga
 Sanskrit text on GRETIL

Translations
 Valmiki Ramayana verse translation by Desiraju Hanumanta Rao, K. M. K. Murthy et al.
  translation of valmiki ramayana including Uttara Khanda
 Valmiki Ramayana translated by Ralph T. H. Griffith (1870–1874) (Project Gutenberg)
 Prose translation of the complete Ramayana by M. N. Dutt (1891–1894): Balakandam, Ayodhya kandam, Aranya kandam, Kishkindha kandam, Sundara Kandam, Yuddha Kandam, Uttara Kandam
 Jain Ramayana of Hemchandra English translation; seventh book of the Trishashti Shalaka Purusha Caritra; 1931
 Summary of The Ramayana Summary of Maurice Winternitz, A History of Indian Literature, trans. by S. Ketkar.
 The Ramayana condensed into English verse by R. C. Dutt (1899) at archive.org
 Rāma the Steadfast: an early form of the Rāmāyaṇa translated by J. L. Brockington and Mary Brockington. Penguin, 2006. .

Secondary sources
 Jain, Meenakshi. (2013). Rama and Ayodhya. Aryan Books International, 2013.

External links

 
 The Ramayana of Valmiki English translation by Hari Prasad Shastri, 1952 (revised edition with interwoven glossary)
 A condensed verse translation by Romesh Chunder Dutt sponsored by the Liberty Fund

 Absolute dating of Ramayana
Collection: Art of the Ramayana from the University of Michigan Museum of Art

 
7th-century BC poems
6th-century BC poems
Epic poems in Sanskrit
Hindu texts
Hindu poetry